Israeli settler violence refers to acts of violence committed by Jewish Israeli settlers and their supporters against Palestinians and Israeli security forces, predominantly in the West Bank. In November 2021, Defense Minister Benny Gantz discussed the steep rise in the number of incidents between settlers and Palestinians in the West Bank, many of which result from attacks by residents of illegal settler outposts on Palestinians from neighboring villages.

Palestinian police are forbidden from reacting to acts of violence by Israeli settlers, a fact which diminishes their credibility among Palestinians. UN figures from 2011 showed that 90% of complaints filed against settlers by Palestinians with the Israeli police never led to indictment. In 2011 the BBC reported that "vast majority of settlers are non-violent but some within the Israeli government acknowledge a growing problem with extremists."

Between January and November 2008, 515 criminal suits were opened by Israel against settlers for violence against Arabs or Israeli security forces; 502 of these involved "right wing radicals" while 13 involved "left wing anarchists". In 2008, the senior Israeli commander in the West Bank said that a hard core of a few hundred activists were involved in violence against the Palestinians and Israeli soldiers.

Some prominent Jewish religious figures living in the occupied territories, as well as Israeli government officials, have condemned and expressed outrage over such behavior, while religious justifications for settler killings have also been given. Israeli media said the defense establishment began taking a harder line against unruly settlers starting in 2008.

In the 21st century, there has been a steady increase in violence and terror perpetrated by Jewish settlers against Palestinians. In 2012, an EU heads of mission report found that settler violence had more than tripled in the three years up to 2011. United Nations Office for the Coordination of Humanitarian Affairs (OCHA) figures state that the annual rate of settler attacks (2,100 attacks in 8 years) has almost quadrupled between 2006 and 2014. In 2021, there was yet another wave of settler violence which erupted after a 16-year-old settler died in a car chase with Israeli police after having hurled rocks at Palestinians. So far it has resulted in 44 incidents in the span of a few weeks, injuring two Palestinian children. In the latter parts of 2021, there has been a marked increase in settler violence toward Palestinians, condemned at the United Nations Security Council.

Israel's settlement policy
 
Israel has justified its civilian settlements by stating the territories in question are not occupied, but disputed, and that a temporary use of land and buildings for various purposes appears permissible under a plea of military necessity and that the settlements fulfilled security needs. The United Nations affirmed the principle of international law that the continuation of colonialism in all its forms and manifestations is a crime and that colonial peoples have the inherent right to struggle by all necessary means at their disposal against colonial powers and alien domination in exercise of their right of self-determination. National liberation struggles are categorized as international armed conflicts by Article 1(4) of the Additional Protocol I to the Geneva Conventions of 12 August 1949 to which the majority of states (including the Western states) are parties. The International Court of Justice concluded that Israel had breached its obligations under international law by establishing settlements in the Occupied Palestinian Territory, including East Jerusalem, and that Israel cannot rely on a right of self-defence or on a state of necessity in order to preclude the wrongfulness of imposing a régime, which is contrary to international law. The Court also concluded that the Israeli régime violates the basic human rights of the Palestinians by impeding the liberty of movement of the inhabitants of the Occupied Palestinian Territory (with the exception of Israeli citizens) and their exercise of the right to work, to health, to education and to an adequate standard of living.

In Hebron, where 500-600 settlers live among 167,000 Palestinians, B'Tselem argues that there have been "grave violations" of Palestinian human rights because of the "presence of the settlers within the city". The organization cites regular incidents of "almost daily physical violence and property damage by settlers in the city", curfews and restrictions of movement that are "among the harshest in the Occupied Territories", and violence by Israeli border policemen and the IDF against Palestinians who live in the city's H2 sector.

Human Rights Watch reports on physical violence against Palestinians by settlers, including, "frequent[ly] stoning and shooting at Palestinian cars. In many cases, settlers abuse Palestinians in front of Israeli soldiers or police with little interference from the authorities."

B'Tselem also says that settler actions include "blocking roadways, so as to impede Palestinian life and commerce. The settlers also shoot solar panels on roofs of buildings, torch automobiles, shatter windowpanes and windshields, destroy crops, uproot trees, abuse merchants and owners of stalls in the market. Some of these actions are intended to force Palestinians to leave their homes and farmland, and thereby enable the settlers to gain control of them."

Causes of violence
One of the causes of violence is settler vigilante action in response to, usually unrelated, acts of Palestinian violence.

Human rights group B'Tselem says that the violence is "a means to harass and intimidate Palestinians" and that the evacuations are a necessary part of the peace process. According to B'Tselem, when a building is evacuated by the Israeli government, settlers lash out at Palestinians because they're "easy victims" and as a means to widen the area under settler control.

Ghassan Daghlas, a Palestinian Authority official who deals with the settlements issue in the northern West Bank, said, "These groups of settlers are organised and support each other...If there’s an outpost evacuation, they call people from Hebron to Jenin to stop the Palestinians working on their lands". Michael Sfard, a lawyer with Yesh Din, an Israeli human rights group which monitors the violation of human rights in the Palestinian territories, stated that there are between a few dozen and a few hundred extremist settlers using a tactic called price-tagging: if the government sends police or soldiers to dismantle an outpost that is being built, the settlers make the Palestinian population pay the price. While people in the outpost are confronting the security forces, others start harassing Palestinians, forcing commanders to divert men from the outpost and making them think twice about launching future operations. It’s such a big headache that many of the relevant authorities give up without trying and the outposts are quickly rebuilt once the army gives up and leaves.

Criticism of violence by settler leaders
The violence by extremist settlers against Palestinians has been condemned by leading religious, political and municipal figures in the West Bank, including Rabbi Menachem Fruman of Tekoa, who said: "Targeting Palestinians and their property is a shocking thing, (...) It's an act of hurting humanity. (...) This builds a wall of fire between Jews and Arabs." According to former Israeli Defense Minister Moshe Ya'alon, "most of those extreme right wing activists" are not settlers and do not represent the settlements community.

The Yesha Council and former Knesset member Hanan Porat has also condemned violence against Palestinians. "The 'price tag' response is immoral", Porat said. "It's unheard of that one needs to burn the vineyards and fields of Arabs. It's immoral ... and it gives legitimacy to those who are interested in undermining the outpost issue. It's a very grave matter."

Yesha Council is the umbrella organization of municipal councils of Jewish settlements in the West Bank. Council chairman Dani Dayan said that settlers must not use violence to advance their means. He said that such actions were "morally bankrupt" and serve only to "hinder the settlers' struggle".

Justifications of settler violence
When an 11-year-old Palestinian girl from Nablus was killed by settlers in 1983, in their defense, the chief rabbi of the Sephardic community reportedly cited a Talmudic text justifying killing an enemy on occasions when one may see from a child's perspective that he or she will grow up to become your enemy. Rabbis have been asked by settler militants to provide rulings to justify acts that are aimed to block peace with, or the return of land to, Palestinians. The theft of Palestinian olive harvests has been justified by some rabbis. Former chief rabbi Mordechai Eliyahu stated that: "Since the land is the inheritance of the People of Israel, planting on this land by gentiles is planting on land that does not belong to them. If someone puts a tree on my land, both the tree and the fruit it yields belongs to me." Some rabbinical extremists cite the biblical edict to exterminate the Amalekites to justify both expelling Palestinians from the land and killing Arab civilians in wartime.

Differing legal status and treatment of Israeli settlers and Palestinians
Unlike Palestinians, Israeli civilians living in the Palestinian Territories are not subject to military or local law, but are prosecuted according to Israeli civilian penal law. This originates in the Emergency Regulations bill enacted in 1967 and extended since which gives extraterritorial rights to Israelis in the occupied territories. B'Tselem has said that the difference in legal status of Israelis and Palestinians in the territories has led to a double standard in which Israelis are given more legal rights and are punished more lightly than the Palestinians who are subject to military and local law. B'Tselem notes the system violates the principles of equality before the law and territoriality.

Referring to settler violence during the police evacuation of the "Federman Farm" near Kiryat Arba, Haaretz has stated in an editorial "Israeli society has become accustomed to giving lawbreaking settlers special treatment", noting that no other group could similarly attack Israeli law enforcement agencies without being severely punished. Haaretz has characterized settler violence on soldiers and policemen who participated in the evacuation of the "Federman Farm" as "terrorism".

In response to the violence directed towards Israeli security forces, Israel declared it would no longer fund any illegal outposts from November, 2008.

After the evacuation of settlers from Hebron in December 2008, a riot ensued and a Jewish settler, Ze'ev Braude, was recorded on video shooting two unarmed Palestinians after Palestinians had hurled rocks at him. The victims were shot on their own property, which Braude had entered, and later needed surgery. The Israeli State Prosecutor's Office decided to abandon the prosecution of Braude after the Israeli High Court of Justice ruled that the prosecution must give the defendant access to "sensitive information". The prosecutor's office had earlier said that some of the evidence against Braude was classified for security reasons, due to "the Shin Bet's sources and methods of operation, and identifying details about its units and people". Braude had petitioned the High Court for access.

Law enforcement action against settlers
The United Nations Fact Finding Mission on the Gaza Conflict reported on rioting and violence in the West Bank in the period preceding the Israeli military operations in Gaza. The report said "Little if any action is taken by the Israeli authorities to investigate, prosecute and punish violence against Palestinians, including killings, by settlers and members of the security forces, resulting in a situation of impunity. The Mission concludes that Israel has failed to fulfil its obligations to protect the Palestinians from violence by private individuals under both international human rights law and international humanitarian law. The report also stated that the International Court of Justice advisory opinion and "a number of United Nations resolutions have all affirmed that Israel’s practice of constructing settlements - in effect, the transfer by an occupying Power of parts of its own civilian population into the territory it occupies - constitutes a breach of the Fourth Geneva Convention".

According to Amos Harel, attempts by the security forces to bring violent right-wing zealots to justice have suffered from two main problems: investigating Israelis as opposed to Palestinians is subject to more restrictions, and courts have proved to be lenient. Human rights nonprofit Yesh Din has produced a report, "A Semblance of Law", which found problems with law enforcement actions against Israelis in the West Bank. According to Yesh Din's study, which was conducted in 2005, among complaints against Israelis, more than 90% were closed without indictments mainly due to perpetrators not being found, 5% were lost and never investigated, and 96% of trespassing cases (including sabotage of trees) and 100% of vandalism and other property offense complaints led to no indictment.

As well as collecting statistics, Yesh Din examined 42 closed investigation files and found a number of shortcomings, including the use of Hebrew to record testimonies given in Arabic; frequent failure to check the scene where the alleged offense took place; often not taking down eye-witness testimonies; widespread lack of recourse to live identification line-ups with suspected Israeli civilians; hardly any confrontations between complainants and suspects; failure to check alibis; hasty closure of files shortly after the complaint was registered: closing of files even when evidence was sufficient to indict suspects: police refusing to register complaints, and pressure from the Civilian Administration being used to avoid filing complaints.

8% of complaints resulted in indictments. The Israeli Justice Ministry responded by stating that legal authorities were closely following specific cases, but said that it was not in its authority to deal with every case.

Israeli security sources have said that it has become customary for some settlers to take the law into their own hands in the wake of Palestinian terror attacks in the West Bank.

In 2008–2009, the defense establishment began taking a harder line against unruly settlers.

In 2012, two EU heads of mission reports stated that Israel's security operations in the occupied territories had failed to protect the Palestinian population; it accused Israel of setting up its operations to minimize the impact on settlers of an ongoing campaign of settler violence. The reports noted that, "Over 90% of monitored complaints regarding settler violence filed by Palestinians with the Israeli police in recent years have been closed without indictment", and further added that, "discriminatory protections and privileges for settlers compound these abuses and create an environment in which settlers can act with apparent impunity".

Administrative detention
Following an attack by settlers on an IDF army base on December 13, 2011, the Israeli government authorized administrative detention and military trial for settlers who engaged in violent actions, similar to the treatment accorded Palestinian activists who engage in similar behavior. The IDF was granted the power to arrest violent settlers and plans were announced to increase security on the West Bank and restrict access by known troublemakers. Israeli Prime Minister Benjamin Netanyahu characterized the situation as a handful of extremists in a population of generally law-abiding settlers. Five West Bank Israelis who are alleged to have planned and participated in the attack on the army base were indicted by the District Court of Jerusalem on January 8, 2012.

Settler riots
Israeli withdrawals from Gaza (in 2005) and an eviction in Hebron (in 2008) triggered settler rioting in protest. There is also continual conflict between settlers and Palestinians over land, resources and perceived grievances.
In August 2007, soldiers clashed with settlers during a raid in Hebron. Paint and eggs were thrown at the soldiers.

A violent settler protest at the Palestinian village of Funduk occurred in November 2007, in which hundreds of extremist settlers converged at the entrance of the village and rampaged after 29-year-old local settler, Ido Zoldan, was shot dead in his car by Palestinian gunmen at the entrance to Funduk. The settlers smashed the windows of houses and cars. According to Funduk villagers, Israeli soldiers and police accompanied the protesters but mostly stood aside while the settlers rampaged.

In December 2008, Hebron settlers angry at the eviction of settlers from a disputed house rioted, shooting three Palestinian rock-throwers and burning Palestinian homes and olive groves. Video footage of the attacks was recorded, leading to widespread condemnation in Israel. The attacks were characterized as "a pogrom" by then Israeli Prime Minister Ehud Olmert who said he was ashamed "as a Jew".

Local Palestinians claimed that once the disputed house was evicted, the IDF and the police were "indifferent" to the violence against the Palestinians, and have made no real attempt to stop the settlers from rioting.

Some settlers have publicly adopted what they refer to as a "price tag" policy whereby settlers attack Palestinian villages in retaliation after settler outposts are removed by the Israeli government.

In April 2009, dozens of settlers from Bat Ayin rampaged through the West Bank village of Safa, smashing car windows, damaging homes and wounding 12 Palestinians. An Israeli army spokeswoman said the violence started when Palestinians threw stones at Bat Ayin settlers praying on a nearby hill before the Jewish Passover holiday.

The United Nations has warned that up to 250,000 Palestinians in 83 villages are "highly or moderately" vulnerable to settler retaliation if the unauthorized outposts in the West Bank are removed by the Israeli government. 75,900 Palestinians in 22 villages are "highly vulnerable". The report also warns that a number of roads around Palestinian villages may become dangerous for the Palestinians to travel on. The settlements Havat Gilad, Kedumim, Itamar, Yitzhar, Ma'aleh Levona, Shilo, Adei Ad, Nokdim, Bat Ayin, Negohot, Kiryat Arba, Beit Haggai, Carmel, and Susya are considered as possible threats to nearby Palestinians. The report criticizes "the inadequate level of law enforcement by the Israeli authorities" and "the ambiguous message delivered by the Government of Israel and the IDF top officials to the security forces in the field regarding their authority and responsibility to enforce the law on Israeli settlers".

Involvement of youths
Some settlers who attacked or harassed Palestinians are disaffected youths, referred to in the Israeli media as Hilltop Youth. In 2008, welfare minister Isaac Herzog (Labor party) labeled them a "security threat", as well as a "societal and educational danger". In December 2011, following an outbreak of settler violence against IDF property and personnel, the Israeli Defense Minister, Ehud Barak, said with reference to the Hilltop Youth, "There is no doubt that we are talking about terrorists".

Attacks on Palestinian agriculture and property

Olive farming is a major industry and employer in the Palestinian West Bank and olive trees are a common target of settler violence. According to OCHA roughly 10,000 Palestinian West Bank olive trees and saplings have suffered either uprooting or damage from Israeli attacks in 2013, a rise from about 8,500 trees damaged in 2012. B'Tselem alleges that "olive pickers in areas near certain settlements and outposts in the West Bank have been a target of attacks by settlers, who have cut down and burned olive trees and stolen the crops", and that "security forces have not taken suitable action to prevent the violence". The IDF barred olive picking in extensive areas of land, stating that the closures were to protect the olive pickers. The case went to the Israeli High Court in 2006 which found that, as a rule, lands are not to be closed because of settler violence, and that the IDF must enforce the law. According to B'Tselem the IDF has worked around this by saying the lands are closed to protect the settlers.

Amnesty International has said that scores of Palestinian-owned sheep as well as gazelles and other animals were poisoned with fluoracetamide near Tuwani on 22 March 2005, depriving Palestinian farmers of their livelihood.

In July 2009, a group of Israeli settlers riding horses and carrying torches raided Palestinian areas, burning 1,500-2,000 olive trees and stoning cars.

In March 2011, two EU heads-of-mission reports detailed a tripling of violent settler attacks over three years. The report found that the attacks were especially aimed at Palestinian farmers and their livelihood in a systematic campaign of violence and intimidation which included the destruction of over 10,000 olive trees in the preceding year. The report noted that the Israeli state had "so far failed to effectively protect the Palestinian population". According to a confidential IDF document for just the period from Sept. 11 - October 20, 2013, the following Palestinian olive groves, near Israeli settlements near Elon Moreh, Karnei Shomron, Kedumim, Ma'on, and the Ma'on Farm, Susya, Shavei Shomron, Zayit Ra'anan, the Gilad Farm, Shilo, and Yitzhar, and all under IDF guard, were damaged, but were not reported in the media:
Sept. 11: 500 trees burned on land belonging to the village of Deir al-Khatab. 
Sept. 15: 17 olive trees chopped down on land belonging to the village of Kafr Laqif. 
Sept. 17: 18 olive trees chopped down on land belonging to the village of Kafr Laqif. 
Sept. 20: 27 olive trees burned in Kafr Qaddum. 
Sept. 21: 70 trees chopped down in Kafr Qaddum. 
Oct. 2: Serious damage to several olive trees on land belonging to the Raba'i family. 
Oct. 2: Serious damage to about 30 olive trees in the village of Jit. 
Oct. 3: 48 olive trees of the Shatat family chopped down. 
Oct. 5: Serious damage to 130 olive trees of the Fukha family. 
Oct. 5: 15 olive trees chopped down and olives stolen in the village of Deir Sharaf. 
Oct. 7: Serious damage to about 60 olive trees and olives stolen in the village of Jit. 
Oct. 7: Serious damage to eight olive trees on land belonging to the village of Ras Karkar. 
Oct. 7: 35 olive trees in the village of Far'ata chopped down, and about a quarter of the olive crop stolen. 
Oct. 8: About 400 olive trees in the village of Jalud set on fire. 
Oct. 13-14: Olive trees and grapevines vandalized in the village of Far'ata. 
Oct. 20: Yitzhar settlers assaulted Palestinians and human rights volunteers as they harvested olives, leaving two farmers and two volunteers - a 71-year-old man and an 18-year-old woman - injured.

According to Yesh Din, 97.4% of complaints submitted to Israeli police by Palestinians who had suffered damage to their olive groves between 2005 and 2013 were closed without indictment.

Claims of staged vandalism
A settler group named Tazpit Unit stated to have documented Palestinians destroying trees with the intention of blaming settlers for the destruction. Photos taken by the group allegedly show Palestinians and left-wing activists cutting down Palestinian olive trees using an electric saw. The settlers stated that many of the reported "price tag" operations by settlers were actually carried out by Palestinians with the aim of tarnishing the settlers' image.

Israeli settlers were accused by an Arab farmer of having gathered his sheep into an area thick with brush and setting fire to the bushes, burning alive his 12 pregnant ewes. The police questioned the farmer's description of religious settlers wearing skullcaps driving a car on Sabbath, as Orthodox Jews do not drive on this day. Caroline Glick writing in the Jerusalem Post reported that the farmer later admitted that he lost control of a brush fire that was responsible for the damage. Israeli media network Arutz Sheva said this incident exposed the tactic of leftists of accepting Arab claims and falsely accusing Jews.

In March 2012, two Arab males of Beit Zarzir confessed, after being arrested, to damaging a local school for Arab and Jewish students. They admitted responsibility for having sprayed on the wall of the school, "Death to Arabs". The school was sprayed twice in February with the slogans "price tag", "Death to Arabs", and "Holocaust to the Arabs".

Well contamination and water access

On 13 July 2004, residents of Hirbat Atwana near Hebron found rotting chicken carcasses in their well after four Jewish settlers were seen in the village. Israeli police said they suspected militant Jews from a nearby settlement outpost called Havat Maon. Settlers blamed the action on "internal tribal fight between the Palestinians;" Israeli police spokesman Doron Ben-Amo said it was "unlikely" that the Palestinians would contaminate their own well. On 9 December 2007, members of Christian Peacemaker Teams, an American NGO, reported to have observed a group of Israelis stop next to a cistern in Humra Valley, open the lid, and raise the bucket. The water was later found to be contaminated. Oxfam, a British NGO, has reported that settlers deliberately poisoned the only well in Madama, a village near Nablus, by dumping used diapers into it; and that they shot aid workers who came to clean the well.

A United Nations survey released in March 2012 documented the increasing use of threats, violence and intimidation to deny Palestinians access to their water resources in the West Bank. The survey stated that Israeli settlers have been acting systematically to gain control of some 56 springs, most of which are located on private Palestinian land. The report noted that settler actions included "trespass, intimidation and physical assault, stealing of private property, and construction without a building permit". The report criticized the Israeli authorities for having "systematically failed to enforce the law on those responsible for these acts and to provide Palestinians with any effective remedy".

Attacks on mosques
In December 2009, suspected settler extremists attacked a mosque in the northern West Bank village of Yasuf near Nablus, according to Palestinian officials and Israeli police. The people forced their way into the mosque and burned about 100 holy books, including Korans, Hadiths, and prayer carpets, and spray-painted anti-Palestinian slogans on the floor, some of which referred to the settlers' "price tag" policy.

In January 2010, Israeli security officers raided the settlement of Yitzhar, forcibly entered the settlement's synagogue and yeshiva buildings and arrested ten settlers, including the Rosh yeshiva, for alleged involvement in the mosque attack. All were released by the court due to lack of evidence and the court reprimanded the police for arresting the rabbi. As of January 2010, no indictments were served. The state has appealed the ruling.

In September 2011, the Al-Nurayn Mosque in Qusra became the subject of an arson attack allegedly perpetrated by militant Jewish settlers, who set the mosque on fire by throwing two burning tyres through its windows. Slogans in Hebrew threatening further attacks had been graffitied on the walls, reading "Muhammad is a Pig". A star of David had also been graffitied alongside. The attack came hours after Israeli police dismantled three structures in the nearby illegal Jewish settlement of Migron, leading newspapers to suggest that it may have been carried out by settlers in retaliation.

On 12 November, the Al-Mughayyir mosque in the Ramallah and al-Bireh Governorate was damaged extensively when it was torched, reportedly by settlers in what was believed to be a price-tag attack. Israeli police say the incident does not match previous ‘price tag’ attacks, and that a full investigation was impossible because they were denied entry to the village by Palestinian authorities. According to Haaretz journalist Chaim Levinson, it was the 10th such mosque subject to arson in Israel and the West Bank since June 2011, and no investigation has ever led to an indictment. Settler violence has impeded Palestinians from visiting holy sites and worshipping at their mosques, and have interfered with muezzin calls for daily prayer.

Attacks on churches and monasteries
The growing ascendency of the right-wing in politics over the past decades has led to increasing attacks on non-Jewish religious properties, associated with "price tag" attacks by settlers and their sympathizers, with a rise in attacks on churches throughout the West Bank and Jerusalem, extending even to Israel. The Patriarch of the Holy City of Jerusalem and all Palestine, Theophilos III has decried, "repeated" attacks on Christian and Muslim places of worship in the Palestinian territories by extremist Jewish settlers.

 Christians who have suffered such abuses often charge Israeli authorities with "not doing enough" to safeguard the population and prevent further attacks by Jews. Arab-Israeli member of the Knesset Ayman Odeh observes, "Harassment and harming of places that are holy to Islam and Christianity have become almost constant, and no one is held accountable", and directly blames the Israeli government for "leading the hatred and approving, with a wink, the continuation of the hate crimes against the Arab minority in the state".

Settler extremism

Many settlers want to be regarded as part of the Israeli mainstream. Only a small minority among them are violent. The number of settlers involved in violent activities is estimated to have grown from a few dozen individuals into a few hundred, out of a total population of about 500,000 Jewish settlers.

Extremist groups associated with the settler movement included the Gush Emunim Underground, which existed from 1979 to 1984 as a militant organization linked to the settler activist group Gush Emunim. They carried out attacks against Jewish students and Palestinian officials, attempted to bomb a bus and planned an attack on the Dome of the Rock.

The New York Times has noted that the religious, ideological wing of the settler movement is growing more radical. It is widely suspected that a pipe-bomb attack on settler critic Zeev Sternhell was perpetrated by settler radicals, who left fliers at the scene offering 1 million shekels to anyone who "kills a member of anti-settlement group Peace Now". Public Security Minister Avi Dichter condemned the attack, calling it a "nationalistic terror attack".

Shin Bet security chief Yuval Diskin warned that he has "found a very high willingness among this public to use violence - not just stones, but live weapons - in order to prevent or halt a diplomatic process". He also called settlers' mindset "messianic" and "Satanic".

IDF Major-General Gadi Shamni has warned that there has been an increase in the number of violent settlers from a few dozen to hundreds and that the increase is impairing the IDF's ability to deal with other threats.

In August 2012, the United States defined settler attacks as 'terrorist incidents'.

In July 2014, a day after the burial of three murdered Israeli teens, Abu Khdeir, a 16-year-old Palestinian, was forced into a car on an East Jerusalem street by 3 Israelis, two teenagers led by a 30-year-old settler from the West Bank settlement of Adam. His family immediately reported the fact to Israeli Police who located his charred body a few hours later at Givat Shaul in the Jerusalem Forest. Preliminary results from the autopsy suggested that he was beaten and burnt while still alive. The murder suspects explained the attack as a response to the June abduction and murder of three Israeli teens. The murders contributed to a breakout of hostilities in the 2014 Israel–Gaza conflict. While it has become a standard operating procedure in Israel to bulldoze the homes of terrorists and their families, and while the mother of the child requested their houses be demolished as are those of Palestinian terrorists, none of the perpetrators' homes were targeted for demolition. While Palestinians are tried in military courts, West Bank settlers are tried in Israel in civil courts, and no Jewish terrorist homes have been demolished. Demolition, the state has argued, does not apply to Jewish suspects of terrorism, because "there is no need to deter potential Jewish terrorists".
The European Union criticized Israel for "failing to protect the Palestinian population".

In July 2015, a similar incident happened where Israeli settlers committed an arson attack on two Palestinian houses (one of which was empty); however, the other house had a family inside. This resulted in the death of Palestinian infant Ali Saad Dawabsheh when his father could not find him in the smoke from the arson fire. Three other members of his family were evacuated and sent to hospital, having suffered serious injuries. These two incidents received worldwide condemnation from the United States, European Union and even the IDF.

International reactions
In December 2011, following a briefing to the United Nations Security Council, all of the regional and political groupings seated at the council issued statements expressing dismay at violence by settlers and right-wing activists, naming the issue as an obstacle to the resumption of peace talks.

In one of a number of statements on the issue, the EU expressed "deep concern regarding settler extremism and incitement by settlers in the West Bank". The statement further added that "the EU condemns continuous settler violence and deliberate provocations against Palestinian civilians. It calls on the government of Israel to bring the perpetrators to justice and to comply with its obligations under international law."

Statistics

The United Nations Office for the Coordination of Humanitarian Affairs shows that more Palestinians were injured either by settlers or members of the Israeli security forces in attacks in the first six months of 2021 than in the whole of 2020 and about equal to the total for 2019. B’Tselem has logged a 33 per cent increase in attacks during the first six months of 2021 compared with the same period last year and said this was "enacted with an increasingly open cooperation by Israel’s security forces and with the full backing of Israeli authorities".
 On 19 October 2021, Linda Thomas-Greenfield told the United Nations Security Council "We are deeply concerned by the violence perpetrated by Israeli settlers in the West Bank against Palestinians and their property," and that "Reports of masked men terrorizing a village in Hebron, destroying homes and injuring children on September 28, and similar acts elsewhere in the West Bank, are abhorrent." She said that the US "appreciated the strong and unequivocal condemnation of this violence by Foreign Minister Lapid, Defense Minister Gantz, and others in the Israeli government," while urging Israel "to investigate these incidents fully, including the response by Israeli security forces."

On 14 November 2021, a report by the group B’Tselem detailed the takeover of nearly 11 square miles (30 square kilometers) of farm and pasture land by settlers over the past five years and that recent months have seen a steep increase in violence committed by Jewish settlers. The NGO said that Israel has been using settler violence as a "major informal tool" to drive Palestinians from farming and pasture lands in the occupied West Bank. Haaretz asked the Israel Defense Forces, the police and the Coordinator of Government Activities in the Territories for a response to the report's conclusion that violence from the outposts and isolated farms serves the state. The IDF Spokesperson's Office said: "The IDF invests a lot of effort in attempts to eradicate the violent incidents in the area, and is in direct contact with the various civilian and security entities in these areas. The IDF will continue to operate in the region, in order to enable law and security in the area." The police and COGAT declined to comment.

See also

 Israeli settlements
 Israeli–Palestinian conflict
 Jewish religious terrorism
 List of Israeli price tag attacks
 Palestinian political violence
 Price tag policy
 Zionist political violence

External links
Law enforcement on Israeli civilians in the West Bank (October 2015). Yesh Din monitoring update 2005-2015 data sheet
UN Map of Settler Violence (2011)

Notes

Anti-Arabism in the Middle East
Anti-Palestinian sentiment in Israel
Human rights abuses in the State of Palestine
Human rights in the West Bank
Israeli settlement
Sectarian violence
West Bank